In the Eastern Catholic Churches, major archbishop (sometimes also styled as major archeparch) is a title for the chief hierarch of an autonomous (sui juris) particular Church that has not been "endowed with the patriarchal title". Major archbishops generally have the same rights, privileges, and jurisdiction as Eastern Catholic patriarchs, except where expressly provided otherwise, and rank immediately after them in precedence of honor.

In addition to their role governing their particular Church, major archbishops, like Eastern Catholic patriarchs, are ex officio members of the Congregation for the Oriental Churches in the Roman Curia. They are required to attend the annual general meeting of this congregation, as well as other sessions if they are visiting Rome or are otherwise able.

There are currently four major archbishops each leading a major archiepiscopal autonomous Church.

Terminology
There was a strong movement within and after the Second Vatican Council to elevate Josyf Slipyj, then metropolitan of Lviv, for the Ukrainians, to the status of patriarch. Many of his admirers use this title for Slipyj when referring to him historically and many in Ukraine use this title for the current major archbishop even today. However (and at the behest of Russian Orthodox officials), Pope Paul VI specifically declined to grant this title, instead creating this new title and appointing Slipyj the first "major archbishop" of Lviv (the seat has since been moved to Kyiv). Slipyj's successors have only used the title of major archbishop.

History 
The title "major archbishop" was first granted to the head of the Ukrainian Greek Catholic Church in 1963. The Syro-Malabar Church became major archiepiscopal in 1992, followed by the Syro-Malankara Catholic Church and the Romanian Greek Catholic Church in 2005.

Comparison to other titles
Compared to other titles available to the heads of sui juris Eastern Catholic Churches, the title of "major archbishop" falls below "patriarch" and above "metropolitan archbishop". The title is used for archbishops of episcopal sees that were founded more recently than the patriarchal sees and are therefore less prestigious. Canon law, however generally treats major archbishops as equivalent to patriarchs, except where specifically provided otherwise. What differences there are between the two offices are mainly differences of ceremony or honor. Major archbishops rank immediately below patriarchs in the order of precedence of the Catholic Church. If made members of the College of Cardinals, major archbishops join the order of Cardinal-Priests, whereas Eastern Catholic patriarchs join the highest order as Cardinal-Bishops. Like patriarchs, major archbishops are elected by the synod of the sui iuris Church, but their election requires confirmation by the Pope, not the simple notification and request for communion required of patriarchs. On the other hand, metropolitan archbishops of Eastern Catholic Churches sui juris are appointed by the Pope (rather than elected by their synod) and have much less authority even within their own churches.

The title major archbishop in the Catholic Church is roughly equivalent to the patriarchal title catholicos in some Orthodox Churches. Catholicos is used internally by the Syro-Malankara Church for their major archbishop.

List of Major Archbishops
This section provides a complete list of every bishop who has held the title of major archbishop, organized according to the precedence of their titles, which follows the order in which their churches became major archiepiscopal. So far, every major archbishop has been a cardinal except for Cyril Baselios and Sviatoslav Shevchuk. Antony Padiyara and Lubomyr Husar are the only major archbishops to resign the office, rather than dying in it.

List of Major Archbishops of the Ukrainian Greek Catholic Church
Josyf Slipyj, Major Archbishop of Lviv, 23 December 1963 − 7 September 1984 
Myroslav Ivan Lubachivsky, Major Archbishop of Lviv, 7 September 1984 − 14 December 2000 
Lubomyr Husar, 26 January 2001 − 10 February 2011 
as Major Archbishop of Lviv, 26 January 2001 − 29 August 2005
as Major Archbishop of Kyiv-Galicia, 29 August 2005 − 10 February 2011
Sviatoslav Shevchuk, Major Archbishop of Kyiv-Galicia, 25 March 2011 − present
For a complete list of heads of the Ukrainian Greek Catholic Church, including prior to its establishment as a major archiepiscopal church, see List of Leaders of the Ukrainian Greek Catholic Church.

List of Major Archbishops of the Syro-Malabar Catholic Church
Antony Padiyara, Major Archbishop of the Syro-Malabar Catholic Church, 16 December 1992 − 11 November 1996 
Varkey Vithayathil, Major Archbishop of the Syro-Malabar Catholic Church, 23 December 1999 − 1 April 2011
George Alencherry Major Archbishop of the Syro-Malabar Catholic Church, 25 May 2011 − present 
For a complete list of heads of the Syro-Malabar Catholic Church, including prior to its establishment as a major archiepiscopal church, see List of Major Archbishops of the Syro-Malabar Church.

List of Major Archbishops of the Syro-Malankara Catholic Church
Cyril Baselios, Major Archbishop of Trivandrum, 10 February 2005 − 18 January 2007 
Baselios Cleemis, Major Archbishop of Trivandrum, 10 February 2007 − present
For a complete list of heads of the Syro-Malankara Catholic Church, including prior to its establishment as a major archiepiscopal church, see List of Major Archbishops of Thiruvananthapuram.

List of Major Archbishops of the Romanian Greek Catholic Church
Lucian Mureșan, Major Archbishop of Făgăraș and Alba Iulia, 16 December 2005 − present 
For a complete list of heads of the Romanian Greek Catholic Church, including prior to its establishment as a major archiepiscopal church, see List of bishops of Făgăraș and Alba Iulia.

Notes

Sources

Further reading

External links
Major Archbishops by GCatholic
Major Archbishop & Archdiocese of Ernakulam-Angamaly
"Syro-Malankara Catholic Church - homepage"

Eastern Catholicism
Episcopacy in the Catholic Church
Catholic ecclesiastical titles
Archbishops
Bishops by type